The canton of Causse et Bouriane is an administrative division of the Lot department, southern France. It was created at the French canton reorganisation which came into effect in March 2015. Its seat is in Espère.

It consists of the following communes:
 
Boissières
Calamane
Catus
Concorès
Crayssac
Espère
Francoulès
Frayssinet
Gigouzac
Ginouillac
Labastide-du-Vert
Lamothe-Cassel
Maxou
Mechmont
Montamel
Montfaucon
Montgesty
Nuzéjouls
Peyrilles
Pontcirq
Saint-Chamarand
Saint-Denis-Catus
Saint-Germain-du-Bel-Air
Saint-Médard
Saint-Pierre-Lafeuille
Séniergues
Soucirac
Thédirac
Ussel
Uzech

References

Cantons of Lot (department)